This is a list of number-one albums in Ireland by year from the Irish Albums Chart. The albums chart is issued weekly by the Irish Recorded Music Association (IRMA) and compiled on behalf of the IRMA by Chart-Track. Chart rankings are based on sales, which are compiled through over-the-counter retail data captured electronically each day from retailers' EPOS systems. While album charts were compiled prior to 1992 in Ireland, these charts are incomplete and unreliable, as they were based on the supply to the retailer rather than consumer sales.

1990s 
1990
1991
1992
1993
1994
1995
1996
1997
1998
1999

2000s 
2000
2001
2002
2003
2004
2005
2006
2007
2008
2009

2010s 

2010
2011
2012
2013
2014
2015
2016
2017
2018
2019

2020s 

2020
2021
2022
2023

See also
Irish Albums Chart

External links
Current Irish Albums Chart – Top 100 Positions